Mission Bay is a  neighborhood on the east side of San Francisco, California. It is bordered by China Basin to the north, Dogpatch to the south, and San Francisco Bay to the east. Originally an industrial district, it underwent development fueled by the construction of the UCSF Mission Bay campus, and is currently in the final stages of development and construction. It is the site of the Chase Center.

Location
Mission Bay is bounded by Townsend Street on the north, Third Street and San Francisco Bay on the east, Mariposa Street on the south, and 7th Street and Interstate 280 on the west.

History
Before urbanization, Mission Bay was nestled inside of a +500 acre salt marsh and lagoon, and was occupied by year-round tidal waters. This area was a natural habitat and refuge for large water fowl populations that included ducks, geese, herons, egrets, ospreys and gulls. The Native American tribes who resided in this area were the Costanoan people who spoke eight different languages which delineated between the various tribelets. The tribe most prevalent in the Bay area was the Patwin people who resided in the area for over 5,000 years.

Beginning in the mid-1800s, Mission Bay was used as a convenient place to deposit refuse from building projects. It was later used as a dumping ground for debris from the 1906 earthquake.  As the marsh quickly stabilized with the weight of the infill, the area quickly became an industrial district. By 1850 the area was used for shipbuilding and repair, butchery and meat production, and oyster and clam fishing.  With the addition of the railroad, Mission Bay became the home to shipyards, canneries, a sugar refinery and various warehouses.

In 1998, the area was announced by the Board of Supervisors as a redevelopment project through the San Francisco Redevelopment Agency. Much of the land had long been a railyard of the Southern Pacific Railroad Company, and was transferred to Catellus Development Corporation when it was spun off as part of the aborted merger of Southern Pacific and the Santa Fe Railway. Catellus subsequently sold or sub-contracted several parcels to other developers. It has rapidly evolved into a wealthy neighborhood of luxury condominiums, hospitals, and biotechnology research and development. From 2010 to 2020, Mission Bay population increased by over 200%.

Attractions and characteristics
Mission Bay was the original headquarters of the California Institute for Regenerative Medicine prior to the organization's move to Oakland.
It is also the headquarters, at 550 Terry Francois Blvd, of the Old Navy brand of The Gap clothing retailer. It is the location of a new research campus of the University of California, San Francisco, UCSF Mission Bay
 Mission Bay was to be the location of a 14-acre, two-million-square-foot Salesforce U.S. headquarters. Salesforce abandoned its construction plans for the area in 2012 and sold 12-acres to the NBA's Golden State Warriors in 2014. The site later became the Chase Center.
 The northern terminus of the Third Street Light Rail Project of the San Francisco Municipal Railway.
 The northern terminus of Caltrain.
 An AT&T Fiber to the premises greenfield project.
 The first new branch of the San Francisco Public Library in over 40 years, The Mission Bay Branch Library, opened on July 8, 2006. It is located on the ground floor of a new multi-use facility, which includes an adult day health center, affordable senior housing, retail space and a large community meeting room.
 455 Mission Bay Boulevard South, originally planned to be the headquarters of Pfizer's Biotherapeutics and Bioinnovation Center (started construction August 5, 2008), occupied by Nektar Therapeutics in November 2010 as their corporate headquarters. The other half of the building is occupied by Bayer's U.S. Innovation Center.
 Location of the San Francisco Public Safety Building at Third Street and Mission Rock. It includes a Police headquarters, Police Station and Mission Bay Fire Station. Funding for the building was passed with a 79.4 percent positive vote on Proposition B.
 The home of Rock Health, a seed accelerator for digital health startups.
 An estimated 56 biotech companies were clustered in Mission Bay in mid-2010.
 The San Francisco Bay Trail.
 The Blue Greenway waterfront trail.
Sinking sidewalk on the 1200 block of 4th street.

Mission Bay is served by the N Judah and T Third Street lines of San Francisco's Muni Metro.  The N Judah links the neighborhood to Downtown, BART, Hayes Valley and the Sunset District, and the T Third Street links to downtown, BART, and the Bayview and Visitacion Valley neighborhoods.  Several other Muni bus and trolley bus lines link the area to neighborhoods to the north, west and south.  The Caltrain commuter rail system connects Mission Bay with San Jose and Gilroy.  The proposed Central Subway project will make the link between Mission Bay, Oracle Park, Market Street-Union Square, and Chinatown even faster.

Although near to and often associated with Oracle Park, the ballpark is in the adjacent South Beach neighborhood. UCSF has built a new 289-bed hospital serving children, women, and cancer patients which opened in February 2015. Construction of the hospital began in October 2010.

Mission Bay has a large residential component with approximately 6,404 apartments and/or condos planned (1,806 of them to be designated affordable).

The Beacon is one of the largest condominium complexes in San Francisco and anchors much of the activity in North Mission Bay.  With 595 condominium units, it sits on a full city block bounded by Townsend to the north, King to the south and 3rd and 4th Streets.  A Safeway anchors the retail sections of the building; a Borders bookstore recently closed, and its space has been occupied by Lucky Strike Bowling.  The building's name refers to its being the first large scale mixed-use project planned for the new neighborhood, and thus "The Beacon" of the area's revival.  The California Institute for Regenerative Medicine also calls the Beacon home.
Madrone is a high-end residential condominium developed by Bosa Development Corporation.  Overlooking San Francisco Bay, the building has two towers with 329 modern residences, many with bay, city and Bay Bridge views.  Sales and marketing firm The Mark Company achieved ongoing sales of 20 units per month in 2012 for Madrone, despite a still recovering economy.  The building went to market in 2011, and more than 200 residences were sold by August 2012, making it one of San Francisco's most successful projects in more than a decade.
Glassworks is a mixed-use building with approximately 40 modern condos of varying floor plans and sizes, located directly across Oracle Park at 3rd Street, between King and Berry Streets.
Signature Properties has built two mid-rise condos on Berry Street: 255 Berry Street and 235 Berry Street. 255 Berry Street was completed in 2004 and 235 Berry Street in 2007.  Both buildings sit between Berry Street and Mission Creek and consist mainly or two-bedroom units of various sizes and floor plans. The first floors contain townhome style condos. Units facing south have views of the creek and South Mission Bay.
Arterra is San Francisco's first LEED-certified market-rate condominium building, located on Fifth Street, between Berry and King Streets (300 and 325 Berry Street). The project consists of three connected buildings, each in a different exterior color: "City" (nine stories), "Park" (six stories) and "Sky" (16 stories). There are a total of 268 condos in the complex.
Park Terrace (325 Berry Street) is similar in construction to both 255 Berry Street and 235 Berry Street in style and height (nine-story mid-rise). The building has 110 market rate homes.
Radiance at Mission Bay is in the south part of Mission Bay, adjacent to the Bay.  It consists of 99 market rate condominiums.
Strata is a market rate apartment complex near the UCSF campus.
Arden is a market-rate residential condominium that was developed by Bosa Development Corporation.

Other notable buildings in Mission Bay include The Gladstone Institute, the Mission Bay medical offices of Kaiser Permanente, and soon-to-be-completed "The Exchange", developed by Kilroy Realty Corp., which will be 100% occupied by Dropbox upon completion in 2019.

Mission Bay Parks completed as of fall 2010 include: Mission Creek, Mission Bay Commons lots on Mission Bay Boulevard between Radiance and the Nektar/Bayer buildings, the 5th street plaza, the sports courts, Koret Quad and China Basin Park. Future Mission Bay parks plans include Bay Front Park, a little league diamond and a junior soccer field.

Education
The University of California, San Francisco opened its Mission Bay campus in 2015.

Construction of the Mission Bay School, the neighborhood's first public school, is scheduled for completion in 2025.

References

External links
 San Francisco Redevelopment Agency, Mission Bay
 SF New Developments - Mission Bay
 Mission Bay Parks

Neighborhoods in San Francisco
South of Market, San Francisco
Populated coastal places in California